is a real-time strategy video game developed by Genki and published by Nintendo for the Game Boy Advance. The game was a launch title for the handheld system in Japan. The game was also published in France under the title L'Aigle de Guerre (lit. "The Eagle of War"). The Japanese version of the game was compatible with the Mobile Adapter GB until December 14, 2002. An unofficial fan English translation patch for the game was released on December 31, 2018.

In the game's Story Mode, players play Napoleon Bonaparte who leads the revolutionary army into battle against the British. Set in the late 18th century, Napoleon's story is told in Fire Emblem fashion via strategic maps and character dialogue. However, the game takes many liberties with historical accuracy, such as Napoleon fighting man-eating ogres and abominable snowmen. The objectives for the missions vary slightly, but the basic idea is to send out units, defeat the enemy and take over the opponent's stronghold.

Reception 
Famicom Tsūshin scored the game a 27 out of 40.

Notes

 Known in France as L'Aigle de Guerre (lit. "The Eagle of War")

References

2001 video games
Game Boy Advance games
Genki (company) games
Napoleonic Wars video games
Video games based on real people
Nintendo games
Real-time strategy video games
Multiplayer and single-player video games
Video games developed in Japan
Video games scored by Masahiko Hataya
Virtual Console games
Virtual Console games for Wii U